() is a concept in Hinduism and Sikhism, which can be translated as "quality, peculiarity, attribute, property".

The concept is originally notable as a feature of Samkhya philosophy. The gunas are now a key concept in nearly all schools of Hindu philosophy. There are three gunas, according to this worldview, that have always been and continue to be present in all things and beings in the world. All of these three gunas are present in everyone and everything, it is the proportion that is different, according to Hindu worldview. The interplay of these gunas defines the character of someone or something, of nature and determines the progress of life.

In some contexts, it may mean "a subdivision, species, kind, quality", or an operational principle or tendency of something or someone. In human behavior studies, Guna means personality, innate nature and psychological attributes of an individual.

Like all Sanskrit technical terms, guṇa can be difficult to summarize in a single word. Its original and common meaning is a thread, implying the original materials that weave together to make up reality. The usual, but approximate translation in common usage is "quality".

Terminology 
Guna appears in many ancient and medieval era Indian texts. Depending on the context, it means:
  string or thread, rope, sinew, chord (music, vowel phonology and arts literature)
 virtue, merit, excellence (dharma and soteriological literature)
 quality, peculiarity, tendency, attribute, property, species (sastras, sutras, the Epics, food and analytical literature)

The root and origins
Guṇa is both a root and a word in Sanskrit. Its different context-driven meanings are derived from either the root or the word. In verse VI.36 of Nirukta by Yāska, a 1st millennium BC text on Sanskrit grammar and language that preceded Panini, Guṇa is declared to be derived from another root Gaṇa, which means "to count, enumerate". This meaning has led to its use in speciation, subdivision, classification of anything by peculiarity, attribute or property. This meaning has also led to its use with prefixes such as Dviguna (twofold), Triguna (threefold) and so on.

In another context, such as phonology, grammar and arts, "Guṇa-" takes the meaning of amantrana (आमन्त्रणा, addressing, invitation) or abhyasa (अभ्यास, habit, practice). In the Mahabharata Book 6 Chapter 2, the meaning of guna similarly comes in the sense of addressing each part (the root implying amantrana), and thereby it means avayava (अवयव, member, subdivision, portion). In Sanskrit treatises on food and cooking, guna means quality, tendency and nature of ingredient. Ancient South Indian commentators, such as Lingayasurin, explain that the meaning of guna as "thread, string" comes from the root guna- in the sense of repetition (abhyasa), while the Telugu commentator Mallinatha explains the root guna- is to be understood in Sisupalavadha as amredana (आम्रेडन, reiteration, repetition). Larson and Bhattacharya suggest that the "thread" metaphor relates to that which connects and runs between what we objectively observe to the tattva (तत्त्व, elementary property, principle, invisible essence) of someone or something.

In the context of philosophy, morality and understanding nature, "Guna-" with more dental na takes the meaning of addressing quality, substance, tendency and property. In abstract discussion, it includes all hues of qualities – desirable, neutral or undesirable; but if unspecified, it is assumed with good faith to be good and divine in Indian philosophy. Thus, Guṇi from the root "Guṇa-" means someone or something with "divine qualities", as in Svetasvatara Upanishad hymn VI.2.

The gunas under various philosophies 

Innate qualities and tendencies are key ancient concepts in Indian literature. Maitrayaniya Upanishad is one of the earliest texts making an explicit reference to Hindu trinity of Brahma, Vishnu and Shiva and linking them to their Guna – as creator/activity, preserver/purity, destroyer/recycler respectively. The idea of three types of guna, innate nature and forces that together transform and keep changing the world is, however, found in numerous earlier and later Indian texts.

Samkhya school of Hinduism 
This category of s has been widely adopted by various schools of Hinduism for categorizing behavior and natural phenomena. The three qualities are:

In Indian philosophy, these qualities are not considered present in an either-or fashion. Rather, everyone and everything has all three, only in different proportions and in different contexts. The living being or substance is viewed as the net result of the joint effect of these three qualities.

According to Samkya school, no one and nothing is either purely Sattvik or purely Rajasik or purely Tamasik. One's nature and behavior constitute a complex interplay of all of all three gunas, in varying degrees. In some, the conduct is Rajasik with significant influence of Sattvik guna; in some it is Rajasik with significant influence of Tamasik guna, and so on.

The balance of Gunas of everything and everyone can change and does. However, change in one quality faces inertia from other two qualities in Indian worldview. Change needs internal or external influence or reinforcement, as knowledge and force to transform. The force to change comes from the Rajas guna, the Sattva guna empowers one towards harmonious and constructive change, while Tamas guna checks or retards the process.

In Indian mythology, Vishnu is envisioned with more Sattva, Brahma with more Rajas, and Shiva seen with all three Gunas.

Nyaya school of Hinduism 
In Nyaya (Generality or common features) school of Hinduism, there is extensive debate on what Guna means, and whether quality is innate, subjective or describable. Early scholars of this school identified 17 qualities, which later scholars expanded to 24 . Different scholars of this school list the 24 differently; for example, Bhasarvajna disallows 6 of the 24 commonly accepted by the ancient scholars. The most commonly accepted list is: color, taste, smell, touch, number, contact, disjunction, farness, nearness, dimension, separateness, knowledge, pleasure, frustration, desire, hatred, effort, weight, fluidity, viscosity, dispositional tendency, merit, demerit, and sound.

Nyaya school considers quality as non-repeatable, a conceptual theme not found in Western philosophy where "quality" is presumed to be repeatable. It is also not found in some parallel schools of Hinduism. Repeatability means that the white in one object is same as white in other object, and white means the same thing. Nyaya scholars hold that "whiteness" is a guna of "white", but that is different from "whiteness" of an object or living being. To them, white has many hues and the "whiteness" is subjective.

In Laksanavali, an ancient Indian text by Udayana, Guna is discussed with more nuance. For example, he writes, "quality of earth" is specific only if it meets three conditions: it occurs in earth, does not occur in anything that is not earthy, and be a distinctive quality that cannot be described as combination of other qualities.

Vaisheshika school of Hinduism 
In Vaisheshika school of Hinduism, which is most related to Nyaya school, states that our awareness, understanding and judgments of any person and thing in the world is relational. All relations, holds this school of Hinduism, is dyadic between anuyogin (referend) and pratiyogin (referent). Guna (quality) is considered one of the seven padārtha (category) of relations. The others are: inherence (samavaya), being (bhava), genus (samanya), species (vishesha), substance (dravya) and motion/action (karman). Unlike Vaisheshika, Nyaya considers inherence as subset of guna (quality).

Gangesha, a Nyaya scholar, suggests a somewhat different theory, stating that our awareness is of two types – true and false. True awareness is produced when we seek to observe some excellence (guna) in its cause, while false awareness results from observing fault (dosha) in its cause. In other words, in Gangesha's perspective, the observer's state of mind and attitude affects relational awareness.

Bhagavad Gita 
Chapters 2, 3, 7, 13, 14, 17 and 18 of Bhagavad Gita discuss Guna. Verse 17.2 refers to the three Guna – sattvic, rajasic and tamasic – as innate nature (psychology or personality of an individual). Sattvic guna is one driven by what is pure, truth, compassionate, without craving, doing the right because it is right, positive and good. Tamasic guna is one driven by what is impure, dark, destructive, aimed to hurt another, contemptuous, negative and vicious. Rajasic guna is one that is ego-driven, out of personal passion, active, ostentatious, seeking the approval of others.

In Chapters 17 and 18, Bhagavad Gita illustrates various items and actions by their three Guna. For example, three types of charity are discussed, and what makes charity Sattvic, Rajasic or Tamasic. Similarly, food, relationships, knowledge and actions are detailed in terms of the three Guna. In Chapter 18, for example:

Similarly, knowledge that is attached to object of action, without concern for understanding the cause, without concern for purpose or significance, is Tamasic knowledge; knowledge that is segregated, that considers everything unconnected, individualistic and meaningless is Rajasic; knowledge that sees one being in all beings, that seeks the whole, a unity in diversity, and similarities in the divided components is Sattvic.

Furthermore, in Chapter 2 of the Bhagavad Gita, Krishna advises Arjuna to transcend the three modes of existence and other forms of dualism.

Guna in theory of ethics 
Guna is one of the four important elements in the framework of ethical theories in Indian philosophy. Bommer et al. suggest that ethical/non-ethical behavior is an outcome of individual attributes, personal environment, social environment and institutional rules and laws. Guna theory is the ancient Indian philosophy on individual attributes, while the theories of Dharma and Ashramas address the personal and social environment, as well as part of its institutional framework. Guna theory, states Crawford, represents a hierarchical theory of values, where the relative order of hierarchy is suggested to vary within each individual along with the relative proportion of each guna. The interplay of three gunas affect an individual's values, and in Hindu worldview, these values affect individual's actions, as well as the happiness and serenity experienced by the individual. The gunas are not considered static and set. Hindu literature, such as the Bhagavad Gita, state it to be dynamic and changeable with knowledge, introspection and understanding of sva-dharma. Realizing one's sva-dharma and Self is emphasized in Indian ethical theories. The highest state of existence and bliss, in Advaita school of Hinduism for example, is jivanmukti (Self-realization) and moksha.

Guna theory's perspective on values constituting human personality is unique yet congruent with other ethical theories.

Guna in cosmology 
Samkhya cosmology combines the three  with primal matter (universe, Prakrti). These are present in all things and beings in the world, and it is their interplay that defines the physical and psychological character and nature. When any of the guna is out of balance in a being or object, the Samkhya school suggests that a pattern of evolution starts, affecting not only itself but its environment. Purusha, or consciousness, is considered separate from Prakriti and changeless.

Guna in other contexts

Sanskrit grammar 
In the Sanskrit grammatical tradition (Vyakarana),  is an ancient language innovation that strengthens vowel-stems, making them more visually palpable when written and more musically resonant when heard. Dwight states that the use of guna makes the Sanskrit language more dynamical, bringing out into relief the idea expressed, given its complexity; in other words, the use of guna in Sanskrit adds depth and sophistication in its phonetic delivery as well as intellectual structure. These innovations are not unique to Sanskrit, but also found in Greek, Latin, Italian and to some extent Russian. Guna and other rules of language for Sanskrit are described by Pāṇini in his Ashtadhyayi.

Guna refers to a set of normal-length vowels that are less reduced than the basic set (in modern terms, the zero grade), but more reduced than the  vowels (in modern terms, the lengthened grade). (This is more understandable once it is realized that, at an earlier stage of development, Sanskrit e and o were ai and au, and Sanskrit ai and au were āi and āu.) Guna corresponds to what is now termed the full grade in Indo-European ablaut. Another orthography and phonology concept related to Guna is Vṛddhi.

Ayurveda 
In the terminology of Ayurveda (traditional medicine), guṇa can refer to one of twenty fundamental properties which any substance can exhibit, arranged in ten pairs of antonyms, viz.  heavy/light, cold/hot, unctuous/dry, dull/sharp, stable/mobile, soft/hard, non-slimy/slimy, smooth/coarse, minute/gross, viscous/liquid.

Guna is also a concept in Ayurvedic medicine, as a system to assess conditions and diets. For this reason Triguna and tridosha are considered to be related in the traditions of Ayurveda.

See also 
 Guṇa (Jainism), the concept in Jainism
 Jain (Satvika)
 Maya
 Nirguna Brahman, Saguna Brahman

References

Further reading 
Narain, Harsh. "Finding an English Equivalent for 'Guna'". Philosophy East and West 11.1 (1961): 45.

External links 
 Sattva, Rajas & Tamas From The Mahabharata
 Guna debate 1, One of many in The Vedanta-Sutras, Ramanuja's views, George Thibaut (Translator)
 Guna debate 2, One of many in The Vedanta-Sutras, Shankara's views, George Thibaut (Translator)
 Chapter 2: Each is Great in His Own Place Sattva, Rajas & Tamas – gunas and Karma Yoga, Vivekananda
 Sattva, Rajas & Tamas From a Shamanic perspective 

Guna